James Jeremy Butler III (born February 19, 1995) is a professional Canadian football running back for the Hamilton Tiger-Cats of the Canadian Football League (CFL).

College career 
Butler played college football for the Nevada Wolf Pack from 2014 to 2016. He then transferred to the University of Iowa for his senior year where he played for the Iowa Hawkeyes in 2017.

Professional career

Oakland Raiders 
While eligible for 2018 NFL Draft, Butler was not drafted and did not immediately sign with any National Football League (NFL) team. However, after attending mini-camp with the Oakland Raiders in May 2020, he signed with the team on July 30, 2018. He was released during training camp, but spent the 2018 season on the practice roster. After re-signing with the team in January 2019, he was waived on April 30, 2019.

Saskatchewan Roughriders 
On May 13, 2019, Butler signed with the Saskatchewan Roughriders. However, he was released at the conclusion of the team's 2019 training camp on June 8, 2019.

Oakland Raiders (II) 
On July 28, 2019, Butler re-signed with the Oakland Raiders. He spent time on the team's practice roster again and did not dress in a regular season game. He was not re-signed at the end of the season.

Houston Roughnecks 
Butler signed with the Houston Roughnecks on January 19, 2020. He made his professional debut in 2020 with the Roughnecks where he had 46 carries for 221 yards and four touchdowns with another 11 catches for 42 yards and a receiving touchdown. He had his contract terminated when the XFL suspended operations on April 10, 2020.

BC Lions
With both the CFL and XFL not playing for the rest of 2020, Butler signed a contract with the BC Lions on December 10, 2020. He made his CFL debut in week 1 against the Saskatchewan Roughriders on August 6, 2021, where he had eight rush attempts for 24 yards and four catches for 32 yards and a touchdown. He played in 11 regular season games where he had 101 carries for 497 yards and two touchdowns and 39 receptions for 243 yards and one touchdown.

In Butler's 2022 CFL season debut on June 11, 2022, against the Edmonton Elks, he scored four touchdowns, tying Geroy Simon and seven other BC Lions players for the club record for most touchdowns scored in a game. He played in 17 regular season games where he had 210 carries for 1,060 yards and seven touchdowns along with 53 receptions for 384 yards and four receiving touchdowns. He became a free agent upon the expiry of his contract on February 14, 2023.

Hamilton Tiger-Cats
On February 15, 2023, it was announced that Butler had signed a two-year contract with the Hamilton Tiger-Cats.

Personal life 
Butler was born in Chicago, Illinois to parents Cornelia William and James Butler Jr.

References

External links
 Hamilton Tiger-Cats bio

1995 births
Living people
American football running backs
BC Lions players
Canadian football running backs
Hamilton Tiger-Cats players
Iowa Hawkeyes football players
Nevada Wolf Pack football players
Oakland Raiders players
Players of American football from Illinois
Saskatchewan Roughriders players